The Battle of Rymnik on September 22, 1789, took place in Wallachia, near Râmnicu Sărat (now in Romania), during the Russo-Turkish War of 1787–1792. The Russian general Alexander Suvorov, acting together with the Habsburg general Prince Josias of Coburg, attacked the main Ottoman army under Grand Vizier Cenaze Hasan Pasha. The result was a crushing Russo-Austrian victory.

Background 
In September 1789, the Ottoman vizier Cenaze Hasan Pasha, vowing revenge for their forces' defeat at Focșani, raised an army of more than 100,000 men, mostly janissaries, to defeat the combined Austro-Russian armies under generals Alexander Suvorov and Prince Josias of Coburg. Sending his troops into a grueling night march, the Pasha attacked the 18,000-strong Austrian detachment. Taking into account Josias's numbers and their poor performance in the war, specifically after the Battle of Karánsebes, the Pasha was convinced that he could defeat this force easily. As the commander-in-chief of all Russo-Austrian forces of the front, he quickly took command of the combined Austro-Russian army.

Battle
Suvorov divided his combined army into two columns to advance towards the Ottoman formations at 11am., the next morning, after crossing the river Rymnik (now known as the Râmna), attacked. As they advanced, they crippled the enemy artillery and adopted infantry square formations to repel enemy cavalry counterattacks which tried to split the Russian army in two. This done, the army stormed the enemy camp and routed them completely.

At 5 p.m., after storming the Ottoman fortifications near the village Bogza (Vrancea) and reuniting with the Austrian army, the combined army then advanced onto a general offensive towards the main Ottoman camp in the forest nearby. While the Austrians advance was pinning down enemy troops, the rest of Suvorov's army outflanked the enemy army and attacked them with cavalry, causing panic among the Ottomans who had almost nowhere to retreat but across the Rymnik, where most of them drowned while trying to cross it.

Casualties
At the cost of 1,000 casualties, Suvorov inflicted about 20,000 casualties against the Turks, who were now in full retreat from the Danubian Principalities. The Turks lost all their artillery and baggage train.

Aftermath
For this victory, Alexander Suvorov was awarded the title of "Count of Rymnik" (граф Рымникский, Graf Rymniksky) by the Russian Empress Catherine the Great. On the other hand, the Ottoman vizier Cenaze Hasan Pasha was dismissed on December 2, 1789, after his defeat. Meanwhile, the Habsburgs occupied all of Wallachia until the war ended.

Gallery

References

Rymnik
Rymnik
Rymnik
Ramnic
Military history of Romania
Rymnik
History of Buzău County
1789 in Europe
Ramnic
Alexander Suvorov
Râmnicu Sărat
Rymnik